Jacob Eugene Duryée (March 7, 1839 – May 25, 1918) was a lieutenant colonel in the Union Army during the American Civil War, who received the brevet grade of brigadier general of volunteers in 1867.

Military career
The son of Union brigadier general Abram Duryee, Jacob Eugene Duryée served at the start of the Civil War as a private in the 7th New York State Militia Regiment. He then was commissioned as a lieutenant and later captain in his father's regiment, the 5th New York Volunteer Infantry (known as the "Duryee Zouaves"), before Colonel Duryée became a brigade commander and brigadier general. As a lieutenant of the 5th New York Infantry, Jacob Duryée was with the regiment in the early Battle of Big Bethel on June 11, 1861. Along with Captain Judson Kilpatrick, Duryée led about 40 men across an open field toward the fortified Confederate position. Going to ground several times cut the New Yorkers' casualties, but ultimately they could not continue their advance because of the well covered positions of the Confederates and the lack of cover for the attackers in the field.

On September 21, 1861, Duryée was transferred to the 2nd Maryland Infantry as its lieutenant colonel. The regiment participated in Major General Ambrose Burnside's successful campaign to retake the North Carolina port of New Bern, culminating in the battle on March 14, 1862. On April 24, 1862, Colonel John Sommer resigned as commander of the regiment and Lieutenant Colonel Duryée took full command. On May 15, 1862, the regiment skirmished with Confederates at Pollocksville and Young's Cross Roads and destroyed the bridge at Haughton's Mill.

The regiment did not finish its work in North Carolina in time to participate in the Peninsula Campaign but joined Major General John Pope's Army of Virginia in time to take part in the Second Battle of Bull Run and the subsequent Maryland Campaign under Major General George B. McClellan.

Antietam

At the Battle of Antietam, Duryée stalwartly led his regiment from the front as the men tried to take the infamous Burnside's Bridge over Antietam Creek in the face of withering fire from Georgia regiments on the hills on the opposite bank. He continued to lead and encourage them as they took increasing casualties but finally the regiment had to break off their attack after 44 per cent of the men in the regiment had become casualties. Following the shock of Antietam, on September 22, 1862, Lieutenant Colonel Duryée resigned his commission as commander of the 2d Maryland Infantry. General Burnside did not wish to accept Duryée's resignation but understood his frustration and ultimately accepted it. After Antietam, fewer than 100 men of the original 953 in the regiment at the time of its organization answered the roll call. Duryée was especially upset that Governor Augustus Bradford of Maryland had visited the battlefield but had not visited the regiment or the makeshift hospital in which so many men from the regiment lay wounded and dying.

After the Civil War
On July 5, 1867, President Andrew Johnson nominated Duryée for appointment to the brevet grade of brigadier general of volunteers, to rank from March 13, 1865, for "gallant and meritorious services," and the U.S. Senate confirmed the nomination on July 19, 1867.

Jacob Eugene Duryée was a member of the Holland Society of New York. The Duryee family were French Huguenots who came with the Dutch to New York, (then New Amsterdam), in 1675.

See also

Notes

References
 Craughwell, Thomas J. The Greatest Brigade: How the Irish Brigade Cleared the Way to Victory in the American Civil War. Lion's Bay, BC, Canada: Fair Winds Press, 2011. . Retrieved December 26, 2011.
 Eicher, John H., and David J. Eicher, Civil War High Commands. Stanford: Stanford University Press, 2001. .
 Holland Society of New York. Year book of the Holland Society of New-York. New York: G.P. Putnam's Sons, 1894. . Retrieved December 27, 2011.

 Mitchell, Charles W. Maryland Voices of the Civil War Baltimore: The Johns Hopkins Press, 2007. . Retrieved December 27, 2011.
 Post, ed., Lydia Minturn. Soldiers' letters, from camp, battlefield and prison New York: Bunce and Huntington, 1865. . Retrieved December 26, 2011.
 Sauers, ed., Richard A., Bolton, William J. The Civil War Journal of Colonel William J. Bolton: 51st Pennsylvania, April 20, 1861 – August 2, 1865. Cambridge, MA: Da Capo Press, 2000. . Retrieved December 27, 2011
 Wilmer, L. Allison, et al. History and roster of Maryland volunteers, War of 1861-5, Volume 1. Baltimore: Maryland General Assembly, 1898-1899.  Retrieved December 26, 2011.

External links

1839 births
1918 deaths
Union Army officers
People of New York (state) in the American Civil War